RAC 105 TV was a Catalan television channel, launched in 2008. It was founded and started to broadcast in 2008. RAC 105 TV was broadcast in Catalan.

On May 31, 2020, it ended its broadcasts to make way for Fibracat TV.

External links
Official Website

Television stations in Spain
Television channels and stations established in 2008
Television channels and stations disestablished in 2020
2008 establishments in Catalonia
2020 disestablishments in Catalonia
Mass media in Barcelona
Music television channels
Music organisations based in Spain